Georgii Adamovich Nadson (Kiev – April 15, 1939) was a Soviet biologist, "one of the pioneers of radioecology in Russia" He became professor at St. Petersburg University in 1900.  In 1930, he founded the Laboratory of Microbiology of the Russian Academy of Sciences (which in 1934 was transferred from Leningrad to Moscow and later transformed into the Institute of Microbiology). He was director of the institute until 1937, when he was "falsely accused of participating in so-called anti-Soviet sabotage and terrorism and arrested" On April 14, 1930, he was found guilty of participation in a terrorist organization, and on the next day he was shot and buried at the Kommunarka shooting ground. The real reason for his execution was his opposition to Lysenkoism.

Ulvella nadsonii, a species of algae, is named for him.

References

I. E. Mishustina. History of Marine Microbiology in Russia (the Soviet Union) in the Second Half of the 20th Century. https://doi.org/10.1023%2FA%3A1025863006270

External links 
 Georgii Adamovich Nadson at www.cybertruffle.org.uk

1867 births
1939 deaths
Scientists from Kyiv
People from Kievsky Uyezd
19th-century botanists from the Russian Empire
Soviet botanists
Soviet geneticists
Soviet microbiologists
Saint Petersburg State University alumni
Full Members of the USSR Academy of Sciences
Great Purge victims from Ukraine
Soviet rehabilitations